The 2017 TCR International Series Monza round was the fourth round of the 2017 TCR International Series season. It took place on 13–14 May at the Autodromo Nazionale Monza.

Roberto Colciago won the first race starting from second position, driving a Honda Civic Type-R TCR, and Stefano Comini gained the second one, driving an Audi RS3 LMS TCR.

Ballast
Due to the results obtained in the previous round, Stefano Comini received +30 kg, Jean-Karl Vernay received +20 kg and Benjamin Lessennes received +10 kg. Nevertheless, Lessennes didn't take part at this event, so he didn't take the ballast.

Classification

Qualifying

Race 1

Notes
 — Ferenc Ficza received a 10-second time penalty for cutting the Turn 1 chicane and gaining an unfair advantage.

Race 2

 — Jaap van Lagen was sent to the back of the grid for Race 2, after an engine change after Race 1. However, due to the lateness of the penalty, his original grid position of 11th was left empty.

Standings after the event

Drivers' Championship standings

Model of the Year standings

Teams' Championship standings

 Note: Only the top five positions are included for both sets of drivers' standings.

References

External links
TCR International Series official website

Monza
TCR International Series
TCR